O' Connell Brook is a river in Otsego County, New York. It converges with Cherry Valley Creek northwest of Middlefield. On 1903 county maps it is referred to as Elm Brook.

References

Rivers of New York (state)
Rivers of Otsego County, New York